Malcolm Andrew Kelland (9 October 1963) is professor of chemistry at University of Stavanger in Norway, known for inventing environmentally friendly chemicals for the oil industry.

He was educated at Whitgift School in Croydon, London. He went on to study chemistry at Oxford University from 1983 to 1990 and was awarded a DPhil in Organometallic chemistry. He undertook postdoctoral research with Rinaldo Poli at the University of Maryland. From 1991 to 2000 he worked at Rogalandsforskning, a Norwegian research institute located in Stavanger (established 1973). Since 2000 he has worked at Stavanger College, which since 2004 has been known as the University of Stavanger.

His research has resulted in Kinetic Inhibitors. These are chemicals that aim at preventing gas hydrates, which is ice formation in oil pipes, a process that also may clog the pipes and cause damage to personnel.  The inventions are called Low Dosage gas Hydrate Inhibitors (LDHI) and cause less pollution than chemicals that have been traditionally used such as methanol and glycol.

His inventions are inspired by how fish survive in cold waters, and use degradable components that resemble the protein found in fish. Kelland is registered as inventor of several patents, some owned by oil companies such as Exxon, and in 2011 he co-founded the company Eco Inhibitors.  Since 2010 he has been the leader of the «Green Production Chemistry» research project.

He has published numerous peer-reviewed journal articles on his research.
In 2009 he also published a book entitled Production Chemicals for the Oil and Gas Industry.

He has received prizes from the oil industry.  In 2012 he was awarded the Lyse Research Award and in 2013 the Sparebank 1 SR-Bank prize for innovations.

Some publications

References

English chemists
People educated at Whitgift School
Academic staff of the University of Stavanger
Alumni of the University of Oxford
British expatriates in Norway
1963 births
Living people